Manoel da Silva Costa, known as Manoel (14 February 1953 – 17 October 2015) was a Brazilian footballer who played as a forward. He competed in the men's tournament at the 1972 Summer Olympics.

References

External links
 
 

1953 births
2015 deaths
Sportspeople from Rio Grande do Sul
Brazilian footballers
Association football forwards
Brazil international footballers
Olympic footballers of Brazil
Footballers at the 1972 Summer Olympics
America Football Club (RJ) players
Sport Club Internacional players
Sporting CP footballers
Portimonense S.C. players
S.C. Braga players
Académico de Viseu F.C. players
Amora F.C. players
S.R. Almancilense players
GS Loures players
Odivelas F.C. players
Campeonato Brasileiro Série A players
Primeira Liga players
Segunda Divisão players
Brazilian expatriate footballers
Expatriate footballers in Portugal